Arlene Banas (born December 24, 1946) is a voice actress, best known for her role as Carly Witwicky on The Transformers.

Roles
The Psychic (1968)-Alice Morgan
Cutter (1972 TV movie)—Arlene French
The Nurse Killer (1975 TV movie)—Christina
The Washington Affair (1977)—Virginia Hawley
This Is the Life (TV series)—Audrey (ep: "Independence and '76", 1980)
Rodeo Girl (1980 TV movie)—Joyce
Eight Is Enough (TV series)—Connie Langston (ep.: “If the Glass Slipper Fits”, 1981)
The Transformers (TV series)—Carly Witwicky (recurring, 1985–1986)
Dynasty—Receptionist (ep.: “The Man”, 1985)
Help Wanted: Kids (1986 TV movie)—Lady with Clipboard
The Colbys (TV series)—Sharon (recurring, 1985–1986)
Falcon Crest (TV series)—unknown (ep.: “Flesh and Blood”, 1986)
Second Serve (1986)-New Jersey woman reporter
Our House (NBC TV series)—unknown (ep.: “Different Habits”, 1986)
Megazone 23 Part II (1987 OAV)—Dump (original English dub)
Sledge Hammer! (TV series)—unknown (ep.: “To Live and Die on TV”, 1986)
Beauty and the Beast—Worker #3 (ep.: “Once Upon a Time”, 1987)
She's the Sheriff—Louise (ep.: “New Year's Eve”, 1988)
Freddy’s Nightmares (TV series)—Dana’s Mom (ep.: “Safe Sex”, 1989)
Double Your Pleasure (1989 TV movie)—unknown
Rock Hudson (1990 TV biography)—Host
Pizza Man (1991)—Marilyn Quayle
Tekkaman Blade (1994 TV series)—unknown
Phantom Quest Corp. (1995 OAV)—Suimei
It’s Like, You Know... (TV series)—Waitress (ep.: “The Long Goodbye”, 1999)
Gate Keepers (2001 TV series)—Additional Voices
The Cookie Thief (2008)—Fiji Lady

External links

1946 births
Living people
Place of birth missing (living people)
American film actresses
American television actresses
American voice actresses
21st-century American women